The Kalands Brethren, Kalandbrüder in German, Fratres Calendarii in Latin, were religious and charitable associations of priests and laymen, especially numerous in Northern and Central Germany, which held regular meetings for religious edification and instruction, and also to encourage works of charity and prayers for the dead.  From Germany the Kaland confraternities spread to Denmark, Norway, Hungary, and France.

History
Originally an extension of the meetings of the clergy of the separate deaneries usually held on the first day of each month (Kalendæ, hence their title Kaland), after the thirteenth century these meetings developed in many cases into special, organized societies to which both priests and the laity, men and women, belonged.  Statutes regulated the conduct of the society, its reunions, the duties of the directors in promoting the religious life and Christian discipline, the services to be held, the administration of funds, and their application to charitable purposes. A dean was the head of each association, and a treasurer administered the revenues.

The associations were encouraged by the bishops, who assigned particular churches or at least special altars for Divine Service. The offering of prayers and the Sacrifice of the Mass for deceased members was especially fostered. The oldest known Kaland confraternity is that of Ottbergen near Höxter (in Westphalia) in 1226.

The "Calendarii" flourished in the fourteenth and fifteenth centuries, but later decayed. A banquet was introduced at the meetings, which subsequently degenerated in many instances into a revel, leading in certain neighbourhoods to abuses. In the sixteenth century the Reformation led to the dissolution of the majority; the rest gradually disappeared, only one being now known to exist, that of Münster in Westphalia.

Sources

References

External links
 Kaland in Bernau
 

Christian charities
Charities based in Germany